L'honestà negli amori is a dramma per musica in 3 acts by composer Alessandro Scarlatti. Written in 1679-1680 when Scarlatti was 19 years old, it was his second opera. The opera uses an Italian language libretto that was written by either D F Bernini or Domenico Filippo Contini. The work premiered at the Teatro di Palazzo Bernini in Rome on 3 February 1680. The opera was performed again in 1682 in Acquaviva delle Fonti at the Palazzo De Mari with Acquaviva laureata a serenata composed by Giovanni Cesare Netti. The opera has since been almost entirely forgotten, except as the source of the aria ‘Già il sola dal Gange’.

The opera's aria 'Già il sole dal Gange', as recorded by Cecilia Bartoli, Luciano Pavarotti and others,  has achieved some popularity.

References

1680 operas
Italian-language operas
Operas
Operas by Alessandro Scarlatti